Two ships of the British Royal Navy have been named HMS Bluebell, after the bluebell flower.

  was an  sloop in service from 1915 to 1930.
  was a  launched in 1940 and sunk by a torpedo in 1945.

Royal Navy ship names